The WNB Golf Classic was a professional golf tournament in the United States on the Web.com Tour. It was played annually at the Midland Country Club in Midland, Texas, and the title sponsor was Western National Bank.

It debuted in 1992 as the Ben Hogan Permian Basin Open at the Club at Mission Dorado in Odessa. The purse was $150,000 and the winner's share of $30,000 went to Taylor Smith on August 30. The course is now part of the Odessa Country Club.

For its 23rd and final edition in 2014, the purse had quadrupled to $600,000 and Andrew Putnam took the winner's share of $108,000.

Winners

Bolded golfers graduated to the PGA Tour via the Web.com Tour regular-season money list.

Notes

References

External links

Coverage on the Web.com Tour's official site
Midland Country Club – official site

Former Korn Ferry Tour events
Golf in Texas
Sports in Midland, Texas
Recurring sporting events established in 1992
Recurring sporting events disestablished in 2014
1992 establishments in Texas
2014 disestablishments in Texas